The Universal Book of Mathematics: From Abracadabra to Zeno's Paradoxes (2004) is a bestselling book by British author David Darling.

Summary

The book is presented in a dictionary format. The book is divided into headwords, which, as the title suggests, run from Abracadabra to Zeno's paradoxes.

The book also provides relevant diagrams and illustrations.

Errors

The first edition of the book had several errors which were fixed in later editions. Several famous scientists have sent in corrections to the author of the book. These include Warren Johnson and Freeman Dyson.

Reception

The book has been praised by BoingBoing and British newspaper The Independent.

Problems and Puzzles mentioned in the book have been discussed and debated several times by several major mathematicians.

See also
 David Darling (astronomer)
 Mathematics

References

External links
boingboing.com
math.com
google.com

2004 non-fiction books
Books about mathematics